John Henry Loft (20 February 1769 – 13 July 1849) was a British soldier and politician.

Early life 
Loft was born on 20 February 1769, in Grainthorpe, Lincolnshire.

Military career 
In 1769 he enlisted in the 15th Regiment of Foot and had been promoted to Lieutenant-Colonel within four years, of an unattached Corps of 4,000 men which he had raised himself.

Political career 
Loft was the member of Parliament for Great Grimsby
 and was much involved with recruiting during the Napoleonic Wars. He was a controversial but influential figure in the development of Grimsby as a port, being one of the original shareholders named in the act of parliament which created the Grimsby Haven Company in 1796.

The antiquarian 
Between around 1826 and 1844, Loft obsessively recorded details of churches, gravestones and memorials around Lincolnshire, many of which have survived and become a useful resource for historians.

Death and legacy
Loft died on 13 July 1849, in a house on Loft Street, Grimsby, which had been named after him.

References

External links 
 Hansard 1803 - 2005 Contributions in parliament by John Henry Loft
 

1769 births
1849 deaths
Tory MPs (pre-1834)
UK MPs 1801–1802
UK MPs 1802–1806
Members of the Parliament of the United Kingdom for Great Grimsby
People from East Lindsey District
East Yorkshire Regiment officers
Military personnel from Lincolnshire